District 1 is a district in the Texas House of Representatives that encompasses all of Bowie, Lamar,Red River, Cass, and Morris Counties. It was created in the 3rd legislature (1849-1851). The district has been represented by Gary VanDeaver since January 13, 2015.

Major cities include Paris, Texarkana, New Boston, Atlanta, Douglasville, and Linden.

Elections

2020

2018

2016

2014

2012

2010

2008

2006

2004

2002

2000

1998

1996

1994

1992

List of representatives

Living past representatives

References

001